Davy Jones's locker is a nautical idiom meaning "the bottom of the sea".

Davy Jones' Locker may also refer to:

Davy Jones' Locker, a 1999 album by The Ocean Blue
"Davy Jones Locker", a song by Buckethead from the 2002 album Bermuda Triangle
"Davy Jones' Locker", a song by Panda Bear from the 2015 album Panda Bear Meets the Grim Reaper
Operation Davy Jones' Locker, a U.S. military operation disposing of captured German chemical weapons after World War II